Florentin Petre (born 15 January 1976) is a Romanian professional football manager and former player.

Club career
Born in Bucharest, Petre started playing football at the youth center of Dinamo București, playing his first Divizia A match for the senior squad on 15 October 1994 in a 2–0 victory over Universitatea Cluj in which he opened the scoring in the 3rd minute. He was loaned to UTA Arad in the second half of that season, playing 8 Divizia A matches in which he scored one goal. He helped Dinamo win The Double, scoring 7 goals in 22 matches in the 1999–2000 Divizia A. In 2000 Petre contracted hepatitis C and had an accident while fishing in the Danube Delta when he touched an electricity wire with his fishing rod and almost lost his life, these events put him on the sideline for almost two seasons, but he sill managed to bring his contribution to the winning of the 2001–02 title by scoring one goal in 10 appearances. He helped Dinamo win The Double again, playing 24 games and scoring 4 goals in the 2003–04 Divizia A season. Petre spent a total of 12 seasons at Dinamo in which he scored 43 goals in 259 Divizia A appearances, winning three titles, five cups and one supercup, also playing 32 games and scoring 6 goals in European competitions (including 3 appearances in the Intertoto Cup). 

Petre left Dinamo in July 2006 and signed a three-year contract with Bulgarian club CSKA Sofia. In his first season spent in Bulgaria, Petre played alongside fellow Romanians Eugen Trică and Alexandru Pițurcă, managing to win the 2006 Bulgarian Supercup and finish runner-up in the championship. In the following season he played 24 games and scored 11 goals, helping CSKA win the 31st title in the club's history. In 2008, Petre went to play alongside fellow Romanians Daniel Pancu and Andrei Mărgăritescu in the Russian Premier League for Terek Grozny. In January 2010, Petre returned at CSKA Sofia for a half of year, alongside fellow Romanians Daniel Pancu and coach Ioan Andone. In both periods spent at CSKA, Petre scored a total of 22 goals in 58 Bulgarian league matches, also appearing in 8 matches in which he scored one goal in European competitions.

Petre ended his career in 2011 at Victoria Brănești, his last game being a 2–0 victory against Gloria Bistrița in Divizia A, a competition in which he has a total of 278 matches played and 46 goals scored.

International career
Petre played 54 games and scored 6 goals for Romania, making his debut under coach Victor Pițurcă on 19 August 1998 in a friendly which ended 0–0 against Norway. He played 8 games and scored one goal in a 2–1 victory against Greece at the successful Euro 2000 qualifiers. He was used by coach Emerich Jenei in two games at the Euro 2000 final tournament, in the first one he came as a substitute and replaced Dan Petrescu in the 64th minute of the 1–0 loss against Portugal in the group stage and in the second one he played the whole game in the quarterfinal lost with 2–0 against Italy. Petre played one game at the 2002 World Cup qualifiers and nine games in which he scored one goal in a 2–1 victory against Finland at the 2006 World Cup qualifiers. He played 7 games and scored one goal in a 2–0 victory against Luxembourg at the successful Euro 2008 qualifiers. He was used by coach Victor Pițurcă in two games in the group stage at the Euro 2008 final tournament, in the first one which was a 1–1 against Italy he played as a starter until the 59th minute when he was replaced by Bănel Nicoliță and in the second one he came as a substitute and replaced Bănel Nicoliță in the 2–0 loss against Netherlands. Petre played one game and scored one goal in a 2–2 against France at the 2010 World Cup qualifiers, making his last appearance for the national team in a friendly which ended with a 2–1 loss against Croatia.

On 25 March 2008, he was decorated by the president of Romania, Traian Băsescu, for his performance in the UEFA Euro 2008 qualifying Group G, where Romania managed to qualify to UEFA Euro 2008 Group C. He received Medalia "Meritul Sportiv" – ("The Sportive Merit" Medal) class III.

International goals
Scores and results list Romania's goal tally first, score column indicates score after each Petre goal.

Managerial career
Petre started his managerial career in February 2012 as Marin Ion's assistant coach at Dinamo II București, moving in the second half of the 2012–13 Liga I season as Cornel Țălnar's assistant at Dinamo București's first team. He had his first experience as head coach in 2015 at Dinamo II București. He reunited with Țălnar in 2017, working as his assistant at Brașov and Luceafărul Oradea, after which he had a spell as head coach at Foresta Suceava. From August 2018 until December 2021, Petre coached Dacia Unirea Brăila, finishing with the team in the last place of the 2018–19 Liga II season, thus relegating to Liga III where he managed to obtain a promotion back to Liga II in the 2020–21 Liga III season, but after the first half of the 2021–22 season in which the team finished last with only two points, he and the club ended their collaboration.

Rallying
Petre was also passionate of motorsport, competing in the national rallying championships of Romania and Bulgaria, becoming rally champion of Bulgaria in 2010 and obtaining the 3rd position at the 2012 rally championship of Romania.

Personal life
His son Patrick Petre is also a footballer who started his career at Dinamo București.

Honours
Dinamo București
Divizia A: 1999–00, 2001–02, 2003–04
Cupa României: 1999–00, 2000–01, 2002–03, 2003–04, 2004–05
Supercupa României: 2005
CSKA Sofia
Bulgarian League: 2007–08
Bulgarian Supercup: 2006

References

External links

1976 births
Living people
Footballers from Bucharest
Romanian footballers
Association football wingers
FC Dinamo București players
PFC CSKA Sofia players
FC Akhmat Grozny players
FC UTA Arad players
Liga I players
First Professional Football League (Bulgaria) players
Russian Premier League players
Romanian expatriate footballers
Expatriate footballers in Bulgaria
Expatriate footballers in Russia
Romanian expatriate sportspeople in Bulgaria
Romania under-21 international footballers
Romania international footballers
UEFA Euro 2000 players
UEFA Euro 2008 players
Romanian football managers
ACS Foresta Suceava managers
AFC Dacia Unirea Brăila managers
CSM Ceahlăul Piatra Neamț managers
Romanian rally drivers